The Frogs was a charitable organization for African Americans modeled on The American Actors Beneficial Association. The Frogs' mission was to build a best-in-class professional organization for Black theater professionals and those in arts-driven professions that rivaled the American Actors Benevolent Association, which did not permit Black membership.

The name

The name “The Frogs” originated from one of Aesop’s fables and the comedy by Aristophanes entitled The Frogs. It was meant to symbolize the organization’s noble goals for the Greater Black community.

George Walker and The Frogs
For performers in the early 1900s, it was apparent that white management ran their shows with a firm grip, allowing for very little advancement of colored actors and performers. Although unions were often negatively perceived in labor professions, it was understood that such professional organizations could be seen as beneficial to performers, both Black and white. 

Frogs founder, George Walker, wanted to build a fully funded, fully supported all-Black network, a functional counterpart to the white theatrical clubs and organizations that were forming during the early 1900s.

His original startup group, The Colored Vaudeville Benevolent Association, received negative reactions from white producers. The concept of the colored man supporting himself through performance and no longer just “taking what they were given” posed a threat to the white vaudevillian and theatrical community. The White Rats, a group of white actors and performers who started a performers club in the same vision as Walker, heavily oppressed the Black community in terms of equality for white productions versus African American productions — and spurred Walker to create the Frogs

On July 18, 1908, at Walker’s Harlem home at 52 West 153rd Street, eleven of the most prominent names in the industry established the African American theatrical organization. They held official elections for the positions of president, vice president, secretary and treasurer, as well as established plans to better the professional standings of the African American man. The Frogs remained a professional club for quite some time, including lawyers and doctors in their mix of members.

Influence 

Several years into the establishment of The Frogs, they became known for their big event “The Frolic of the Frogs” or “The Frogs Frolic” every August at the Manhattan Casino (New York City) at 155th Street and Eighth Avenue. For 50 cents, people enjoyed a combination ball, party and vaudeville show where favors were given to the ladies and door prizes went to the three people wearing the most unusual costumes symbolic of the frogs. With great success in the early years of the event, “The Frolic of the Frogs” was able to tour their event in cities such as Philadelphia, Richmond, Baltimore and Washington D.C. Popularity in the frolic was found among both Blacks and whites.

In addition to “The Frolic of the Frogs,” The Frogs were known for their charity work, donating to several charitable organizations. They were also highly regarded and admired in Harlem, as well as other areas of the country. The organization’s intention was to also establish an archival collection of theatrical material.

In the later years of The Frogs, a clubhouse for the organization was established in Harlem at 111 West 32nd Street. With a strong and variable professional reputation, the organization expanded its member base beyond the walls of actors and performers, bringing in members from professional and business backgrounds, continuing to prosper in the success of establishing a highly regarded organization for colored men.

In 1910, Bert Williams stepped up as the second president of The Frogs, with the anticipation of Walker’s passing in 1911. With the success of the organization in its early years, the organization continued to flourish well into the 1920s.

Founding members 

George Walker (original founder, President)
J. Rosamond Johnson (original Vice President, professional composer)
Jesse Shipp (original Treasurer, professional performer and librettist)
R.C. McPherson or “Cecil Mack” (original Secretary, professional lyricist)
Bert Williams (professional comedian and partner of George Walker)
Bob Cole (professional singer, songwriter, and partner of J Rosamond Johnson)
Lester A. Walton (professional critic and actor’s agent)
James Reese Europe (bandleader)
Alex Rogers (professional lyricist)
Tom Brown (professional dancer)
Sam Corker, Jr. (business manager and advance agent)
Will (William) H. Dixon (The Original Dancing Conductor), Musician, bandleader, composer, singer/songwriter, playwright

References

Bibliography 
 Bert Williams Jokebooks, Schomburg Center for Research in Black Culture, The New York Public Library
 Cullen, Frank, Florence Hackman, and Donald McNeilly. Vaudeville, Old and New: An Encyclopedia of Variety Performers in America. New York: Routledge, 2006. Pg 421.
 Jasen, David A., and Gene Jones. Spreadin' Rhythm Around: Black Popular Songwriters, 1880-1930. New York: Schirmer, 1998.
 Smith, Eric Ledell. Bert Williams: A Biography of the Pioneer Black Comedian. Jefferson, NC: McFarland, 1992. Pg 106.
 Sotiropoulos, Karen. Staging Race: Black Performers in Turn of the Century America. Cambridge: Harvard University Press, 2009. pp. 202–205.
Welcome to The Black Box, Personal Narratives in High Definition. Schomburg Center for Research in Black Culture

See also
African American musical theater

1908 establishments in New York City
Organizations established in 1908
Theatrical organizations in the United States